Interior Health is a regional health authority in British Columbia. It is one of the five publicly-funded regional health authorities, serving the southern Interior region of British Columbia.

Facilities 
As of 2020 Interior Health operates 16 community hospitals, 4 regional hospitals, 2 tertiary hospitals and 22 health care centers, including:

Activities 
Interior Health received a $195,814 grant from the Public Health Agency of Canada's Immunization Partnership fund to implement an automated electronic reminder system for vaccination appointments across the region.

See also

Other regional health authorities in British Columbia

 Vancouver Coastal Health
 Fraser Health
 Island Health
 Northern Health

Province-wide health authorities in British Columbia

 Provincial Health Services Authority
 First Nations Health Authority

References

External links
 

2001 establishments in British Columbia
Health regions of British Columbia
Interior of British Columbia